The 2017 Yas Marina GP3 Series round was the final showdown of the 2017 GP3 Series. It was held on 25 and 26 November 2017 at Yas Marina Circuit in Abu Dhabi, United Arab Emirates. The race supported the 2017 Abu Dhabi Grand Prix.

Classification

Qualifying

Feature Race

Sprint Race

Championship standings after the round

Drivers' Championship standings

Teams' Championship standings

 Note: Only the top five positions are included for both sets of standings.

Notes

References

|- style="text-align:center"
|width="35%"|Previous race:
|width="30%"|GP3 Series2017 season
|width="40%"|Next race:

Yas Marina
GP3
GP3 Yas Marina